XHAGT-FM is a Regional Mexican radio station branded as La Mejor that serves the state of Aguascalientes, Mexico.

History
XHAGT-FM started as a Top 40 station called Estéreo 93 before becoming classic rock-formatted Classics 93. In 1996, Radio Universal and MVS Radio partnered, which resulted in 93.7 FM picking up MVS's Stereorey network. It also began to air the morning news program Para Empezar hosted by Pedro Ferriz de Con. On September 2, 2002, as part of a national strategy, Stereorey changed its name to Best FM and later, on November 1, 2005, 93.7 FM again changed its name and format, taking the La Mejor national format from MVS.

References

External links
 Official website
 La Mejor 93.7

Mass media in Aguascalientes City
Radio stations established in 1992
Radio stations in Aguascalientes
Regional Mexican radio stations
Spanish-language radio stations